CHGO-FM is a Canadian radio station, which broadcasts at 104.3 FM in Val-d'Or, Quebec. Owned and operated by Arsenal Media, the station airs an active rock format branded as Capitale Rock. It also shares much of its programming with CJGO-FM in La Sarre, although the two stations each produce their own separate morning programs.

The radio station originally began as CKVD 900, an AM station that was part of the Abitibi AM network since 1939 with CHAD Amos (now defunct) and CKRN Rouyn-Noranda (now CHOA-FM), until it was converted to FM in 1999. CHGO also had a rebroadcaster in:
Rouyn-Noranda, CJGO-FM-1 95.7
La Sarre, CJGO-FM at 102.1. On August 6, 2010, the CRTC granted that repeater to switch to CJGO.

References

External links
 
 
 

Hgo
Hgo
Hgo
Radio stations established in 1937
1937 establishments in Quebec